Leptosphaeria is a genus of fungi in the family Phaeosphaeriaceae.

Species

Leptosphaeria abbreviata
Leptosphaeria abuensis
Leptosphaeria abutilonis
Leptosphaeria aceris
Leptosphaeria acheniorum
Leptosphaeria acuta
Leptosphaeria acutispora
Leptosphaeria acutiuscula
Leptosphaeria adesmicola
Leptosphaeria agaves
Leptosphaeria aggregata
Leptosphaeria ahmadii
Leptosphaeria akagiensis
Leptosphaeria albopunctata
Leptosphaeria albulae
Leptosphaeria alexandrinis
Leptosphaeria algarbiensis
Leptosphaeria alhagi
Leptosphaeria aliena
Leptosphaeria allorgei
Leptosphaeria almeidae
Leptosphaeria almeidana
Leptosphaeria aloes
Leptosphaeria alopecuri
Leptosphaeria alpiniae
Leptosphaeria ambiens
Leptosphaeria ammothamni
Leptosphaeria amorphae
Leptosphaeria ampelina
Leptosphaeria anacycli
Leptosphaeria anarrhini
Leptosphaeria anceps
Leptosphaeria andrijevicensis
Leptosphaeria anemones
Leptosphaeria anisomeres
Leptosphaeria antherici
Leptosphaeria apios
Leptosphaeria apios-fortunei
Leptosphaeria apocyni
Leptosphaeria aquatica
Leptosphaeria aquilariae
Leptosphaeria arbuti
Leptosphaeria arctalaskana
Leptosphaeria arecae
Leptosphaeria arnoldii
Leptosphaeria artemisiae
Leptosphaeria arthrophyma
Leptosphaeria arunci
Leptosphaeria asclepiadis
Leptosphaeria asparagi
Leptosphaeria aspidistrae
Leptosphaeria astericola
Leptosphaeria asteris
Leptosphaeria atraphaxis
Leptosphaeria atriplicis
Leptosphaeria atropurpurea
Leptosphaeria auerswaldii
Leptosphaeria australiensis
Leptosphaeria avenaria
Leptosphaeria avicenniae
Leptosphaeria bacillifera
Leptosphaeria baggei
Leptosphaeria balcarica
Leptosphaeria baldratiana
Leptosphaeria ballotae
Leptosphaeria bambusicola
Leptosphaeria bardanae
Leptosphaeria barriae
Leptosphaeria basalduai
Leptosphaeria batumensis
Leptosphaeria baumii
Leptosphaeria belamcadae
Leptosphaeria bellynckii
Leptosphaeria berberidicola
Leptosphaeria biebersteinii
Leptosphaeria bispora
Leptosphaeria blumeri
Leptosphaeria bomareae
Leptosphaeria bondari
Leptosphaeria bondarii
Leptosphaeria bornmuelleri
Leptosphaeria borziana
Leptosphaeria braunii
Leptosphaeria bresadolana
Leptosphaeria brightonensis
Leptosphaeria bubakii
Leptosphaeria buddlejae
Leptosphaeria bulgarica
Leptosphaeria buxina
Leptosphaeria byssincola
Leptosphaeria caballeroi
Leptosphaeria cacuminispora
Leptosphaeria caespitosa
Leptosphaeria calligoni
Leptosphaeria calopogonii
Leptosphaeria calvescens
Leptosphaeria camelliae-japonicae
Leptosphaeria camphorosmae
Leptosphaeria canephorae
Leptosphaeria cannabina
Leptosphaeria caricis-vulpinae
Leptosphaeria carlinoides
Leptosphaeria carneomaculans
Leptosphaeria casta
Leptosphaeria castagnei
Leptosphaeria castillejae
Leptosphaeria castrensis
Leptosphaeria catalaunica
Leptosphaeria caucana
Leptosphaeria cavanillesii
Leptosphaeria cavarae
Leptosphaeria ceballosi
Leptosphaeria cecropiae
Leptosphaeria cephalariae-uralensis
Leptosphaeria cerastii
Leptosphaeria cercocarpi
Leptosphaeria cerei-peruviani
Leptosphaeria cesatiana
Leptosphaeria chamaeropis
Leptosphaeria chenopodii-albi
Leptosphaeria chilensis
Leptosphaeria chochrjakovii
Leptosphaeria chusqueae
Leptosphaeria cinnamomi
Leptosphaeria cirsii-arvensis
Leptosphaeria cisticola
Leptosphaeria cistina
Leptosphaeria clara
Leptosphaeria clarkii
Leptosphaeria clavata
Leptosphaeria clavispora
Leptosphaeria clematidicola
Leptosphaeria clerodendri
Leptosphaeria coccothrinacis
Leptosphaeria cocoës
Leptosphaeria coffaeicida
Leptosphaeria coffeigena
Leptosphaeria coleosanthi
Leptosphaeria colocasiae
Leptosphaeria compressa
Leptosphaeria conii
Leptosphaeria coniigena
Leptosphaeria coniigera
Leptosphaeria coniothyrium
Leptosphaeria contecta
Leptosphaeria cookei
Leptosphaeria coorgica
Leptosphaeria cordylines
Leptosphaeria cornuta
Leptosphaeria coronillae
Leptosphaeria corrugans
Leptosphaeria cosmicola
Leptosphaeria coumarounae
Leptosphaeria crozalsiana
Leptosphaeria crozalsii
Leptosphaeria cruchetii
Leptosphaeria cruenta
Leptosphaeria cryptica
Leptosphaeria culmicola
Leptosphaeria culmifraga
Leptosphaeria cycadis
Leptosphaeria cylindrostoma
Leptosphaeria cynodontis-dactyli
Leptosphaeria cynosuri
Leptosphaeria cyperi
Leptosphaeria cypericola
Leptosphaeria daphnes
Leptosphaeria daphniphylli
Leptosphaeria darkeri
Leptosphaeria davidii
Leptosphaeria daviesiae
Leptosphaeria davisiana
Leptosphaeria dearnessii
Leptosphaeria deficiens
Leptosphaeria dematiicola
Leptosphaeria densa
Leptosphaeria derasa
Leptosphaeria desciscens
Leptosphaeria desmodii
Leptosphaeria dianthi
Leptosphaeria dichosciadii
Leptosphaeria didymellae-vincetoxici
Leptosphaeria dioica
Leptosphaeria dobrogica
Leptosphaeria dodonaeae
Leptosphaeria doliolum
Leptosphaeria dracaenae
Leptosphaeria draconis
Leptosphaeria drechsleri
Leptosphaeria dryadis
Leptosphaeria dumetorum
Leptosphaeria duplex
Leptosphaeria echiella
Leptosphaeria eichhorniae
Leptosphaeria elaeidicola
Leptosphaeria elaoudi
Leptosphaeria empetri
Leptosphaeria ephedrae
Leptosphaeria epicarecta
Leptosphaeria epilobii
Leptosphaeria equiseticola
Leptosphaeria eremophila
Leptosphaeria eriobotryae
Leptosphaeria errabunda
Leptosphaeria erythrinae
Leptosphaeria espeletiae
Leptosphaeria etheridgei
Leptosphaeria eumorpha
Leptosphaeria eustoma
Leptosphaeria eustomoides
Leptosphaeria exocarpogena
Leptosphaeria fallax
Leptosphaeria faullii
Leptosphaeria feltgenii
Leptosphaeria ferruginea
Leptosphaeria fibrincola
Leptosphaeria fici-elasticae
Leptosphaeria flotoviae
Leptosphaeria foeniculi
Leptosphaeria foliicola
Leptosphaeria folliculata
Leptosphaeria francoae
Leptosphaeria fraserae
Leptosphaeria frigida
Leptosphaeria frondis
Leptosphaeria fuscella
Leptosphaeria fusispora
Leptosphaeria galeobdolonis
Leptosphaeria galeopsidicola
Leptosphaeria galii-silvatici
Leptosphaeria galiorum
Leptosphaeria galligena
Leptosphaeria gaubae
Leptosphaeria gaultheriae
Leptosphaeria geasteris
Leptosphaeria genistae
Leptosphaeria georgius-fischeri
Leptosphaeria ginimia
Leptosphaeria ginkgo
Leptosphaeria glandulosae
Leptosphaeria gloeospora
Leptosphaeria glyceriae
Leptosphaeria gossypii
Leptosphaeria gratissima
Leptosphaeria grignonnensis
Leptosphaeria grisea
Leptosphaeria grossulariae
Leptosphaeria guazumae
Leptosphaeria guiyan
Leptosphaeria gymnosporiae-rothianae
Leptosphaeria haematites
Leptosphaeria haloxyli
Leptosphaeria hamamelidis
Leptosphaeria hardenbergiae
Leptosphaeria hazslinszkii
Leptosphaeria helminthospora
Leptosphaeria helvetica
Leptosphaeria hemicrypta
Leptosphaeria hesperia
Leptosphaeria hesperidicola
Leptosphaeria heterospora
Leptosphaeria heufleri
Leptosphaeria heveae
Leptosphaeria hispanica
Leptosphaeria hollosiana
Leptosphaeria hollosii
Leptosphaeria holmii
Leptosphaeria holmiorum
Leptosphaeria holmskjoldii
Leptosphaeria honiaraensis
Leptosphaeria hordei
Leptosphaeria hormodactyli
Leptosphaeria hottai
Leptosphaeria houseana
Leptosphaeria hrubyana
Leptosphaeria hurae
Leptosphaeria huthiana
Leptosphaeria hyalina
Leptosphaeria hydrangeae
Leptosphaeria hydrophila
Leptosphaeria hymenaeae
Leptosphaeria hyparrheniae
Leptosphaeria hypericicola
Leptosphaeria icositana
Leptosphaeria inarensis
Leptosphaeria incruenta
Leptosphaeria indica
Leptosphaeria inecola
Leptosphaeria inquinans
Leptosphaeria insulana
Leptosphaeria iridis
Leptosphaeria isocellula
Leptosphaeria italica 
Leptosphaeria iwamotoi
Leptosphaeria jacksonensis
Leptosphaeria jacksonii
Leptosphaeria johansonii
Leptosphaeria jubaeae
Leptosphaeria junci
Leptosphaeria junci-acuti
Leptosphaeria junci-glauci
Leptosphaeria junciseda
Leptosphaeria kerguelensis
Leptosphaeria kochiana
Leptosphaeria kotschyana
Leptosphaeria kuangfuensis
Leptosphaeria ladina
Leptosphaeria lagenoides
Leptosphaeria larvalis
Leptosphaeria lassenensis
Leptosphaeria lauri
Leptosphaeria lavandulae
Leptosphaeria lecanora
Leptosphaeria leersiae
Leptosphaeria lelebae
Leptosphaeria lespedezae
Leptosphaeria leucadendri
Leptosphaeria libanotis
Leptosphaeria linearis
Leptosphaeria lingue
Leptosphaeria lithophilae
Leptosphaeria littoralis
Leptosphaeria livida
Leptosphaeria lobeliae
Leptosphaeria lolii
Leptosphaeria longan
Leptosphaeria longipedicellata
Leptosphaeria longispora
Leptosphaeria lonicerae
Leptosphaeria lonicerina
Leptosphaeria lucina
Leptosphaeria lunariae
Leptosphaeria lupinicola
Leptosphaeria lusitanica
Leptosphaeria luxemburgensis
Leptosphaeria lyciophila
Leptosphaeria lyndonvillae
Leptosphaeria lythri
Leptosphaeria macounii
Leptosphaeria macrocapsa
Leptosphaeria macrochloae
Leptosphaeria macromodesta
Leptosphaeria macrosporoides
Leptosphaeria maculans
Leptosphaeria maderensis
Leptosphaeria magnoliae
Leptosphaeria major
Leptosphaeria malojensis
Leptosphaeria malyi
Leptosphaeria mandshurica
Leptosphaeria marantae
Leptosphaeria marina
Leptosphaeria martagoni
Leptosphaeria matisiae
Leptosphaeria matritensis
Leptosphaeria maydis
Leptosphaeria media
Leptosphaeria medicaginicola
Leptosphaeria megalotheca
Leptosphaeria meliloti
Leptosphaeria mellispora
Leptosphaeria mendozana
Leptosphaeria menthae
Leptosphaeria meomaritima
Leptosphaeria metasequoiae
Leptosphaeria microthyrioides
Leptosphaeria mikaniae
Leptosphaeria millefolii
Leptosphaeria modesta
Leptosphaeria montana
Leptosphaeria morierae
Leptosphaeria morindae
Leptosphaeria moutan
Leptosphaeria moutoniana
Leptosphaeria mucosa
Leptosphaeria muirensis
Leptosphaeria multiseptata
Leptosphaeria musae
Leptosphaeria muscari
Leptosphaeria musicola
Leptosphaeria musigena
Leptosphaeria myricae
Leptosphaeria myrti
Leptosphaeria myrticola
Leptosphaeria mysorensis
Leptosphaeria nanae
Leptosphaeria nandinae
Leptosphaeria napelli
Leptosphaeria nashi
Leptosphaeria nectrioides
Leptosphaeria nesodes
Leptosphaeria nigrificans
Leptosphaeria nigromaculata
Leptosphaeria norvegica
Leptosphaeria noveboracensis
Leptosphaeria nypicola
Leptosphaeria obesa
Leptosphaeria octophragmia
Leptosphaeria ogilviensis
Leptosphaeria onagrae
Leptosphaeria onobrychidicola
Leptosphaeria onobrychidis
Leptosphaeria orae-maris
Leptosphaeria ornithogali
Leptosphaeria orthrosanthi
Leptosphaeria oryzicola
Leptosphaeria oryzina
Leptosphaeria pachytheca
Leptosphaeria pacifica
Leptosphaeria pampaniniana
Leptosphaeria pandani
Leptosphaeria pandanicola
Leptosphaeria paoluccii
Leptosphaeria papaveris
Leptosphaeria papillata
Leptosphaeria papillosa
Leptosphaeria paraguariensis
Leptosphaeria parmeliarum
Leptosphaeria pedicularis
Leptosphaeria pelagica
Leptosphaeria pelargonii
Leptosphaeria penniseti
Leptosphaeria penniseticola
Leptosphaeria periclymeni
Leptosphaeria perplexa
Leptosphaeria peruviana
Leptosphaeria petiolaris
Leptosphaeria petrakii
Leptosphaeria petri
Leptosphaeria phacae
Leptosphaeria phlogis
Leptosphaeria phoenicis
Leptosphaeria phoenix
Leptosphaeria phormii
Leptosphaeria phyllachoricola
Leptosphaeria phyllachorivira
Leptosphaeria phyllostachydis
Leptosphaeria physostegiae
Leptosphaeria pilulariae
Leptosphaeria pini
Leptosphaeria planiuscula
Leptosphaeria platanicola
Leptosphaeria platychorae
Leptosphaeria platypus
Leptosphaeria plectrospora
Leptosphaeria plocamae
Leptosphaeria plurisepta
Leptosphaeria polini
Leptosphaeria politis
Leptosphaeria polygonati
Leptosphaeria polylepidis
Leptosphaeria polytrichina
Leptosphaeria porellae
Leptosphaeria portoricensis
Leptosphaeria praeandina
Leptosphaeria praeclara
Leptosphaeria pratensis
Leptosphaeria priuscheggiana
Leptosphaeria proteicola
Leptosphaeria protousneae
Leptosphaeria pruni
Leptosphaeria pseudodiaporthe
Leptosphaeria pseudohleria
Leptosphaeria pterocelastri
Leptosphaeria punicae
Leptosphaeria punjabensis
Leptosphaeria purpurea
Leptosphaeria pusilla
Leptosphaeria puttemansii
Leptosphaeria pycnostigma
Leptosphaeria quamoclidii
Leptosphaeria rajasthanensis
Leptosphaeria ramsaugiensis
Leptosphaeria ranunculi-polyanthemi
Leptosphaeria ranunculoides
Leptosphaeria raphani
Leptosphaeria recutita
Leptosphaeria rehmii
Leptosphaeria reidiana
Leptosphaeria restionis
Leptosphaeria rhodiolicola
Leptosphaeria rhopographoides
Leptosphaeria riofrioi
Leptosphaeria rivalis
Leptosphaeria rivularis
Leptosphaeria robusta
Leptosphaeria rostrata
Leptosphaeria rostrupii
Leptosphaeria rubefaciens
Leptosphaeria rubella
Leptosphaeria rubicunda
Leptosphaeria rugosa
Leptosphaeria rulingiae
Leptosphaeria rumicicola
Leptosphaeria rusci
Leptosphaeria ruscicola
Leptosphaeria russellii
Leptosphaeria ruthenica
Leptosphaeria saccharicola
Leptosphaeria salicaria
Leptosphaeria salviae
Leptosphaeria schefflerae
Leptosphaeria schneideriana
Leptosphaeria schoenocauli
Leptosphaeria scitula
Leptosphaeria sclerotioides
Leptosphaeria scolecosporarum
Leptosphaeria scutati
Leptosphaeria secalina
Leptosphaeria semelina
Leptosphaeria senegalensis
Leptosphaeria sepalorum
Leptosphaeria septemcellulata
Leptosphaeria septovariata
Leptosphaeria shahvarica
Leptosphaeria shastensis
Leptosphaeria sibthorpii
Leptosphaeria sieversiae
Leptosphaeria sileris
Leptosphaeria silvestris
Leptosphaeria simillima
Leptosphaeria simmonsii
Leptosphaeria sinapis
Leptosphaeria smarodsii
Leptosphaeria solani
Leptosphaeria solanicola
Leptosphaeria solheimii
Leptosphaeria sophorae
Leptosphaeria sorbi
Leptosphaeria sparganii
Leptosphaeria sparti
Leptosphaeria spegazzinii
Leptosphaeria staritzii
Leptosphaeria staticicola
Leptosphaeria sticta
Leptosphaeria stipae-minor
Leptosphaeria stratiotis
Leptosphaeria striolata
Leptosphaeria suaedae
Leptosphaeria subarticulata
Leptosphaeria subcompressa
Leptosphaeria submaculans
Leptosphaeria subriparia
Leptosphaeria substerilis
Leptosphaeria suffulta
Leptosphaeria surculorum
Leptosphaeria swertiae
Leptosphaeria sydowii
Leptosphaeria taichungensis
Leptosphaeria tamaricis
Leptosphaeria tami
Leptosphaeria taurica
Leptosphaeria telopeae
Leptosphaeria tenuis
Leptosphaeria tetonensis
Leptosphaeria thalictricola
Leptosphaeria thalictrina
Leptosphaeria themedicola
Leptosphaeria theobromicola
Leptosphaeria thujicola
Leptosphaeria tigrisoides
Leptosphaeria tiroliensis
Leptosphaeria tolgorensis
Leptosphaeria tollens
Leptosphaeria tompkinsii
Leptosphaeria tonduzii
Leptosphaeria torbolensis
Leptosphaeria tornatospora
Leptosphaeria torrendii
Leptosphaeria trematostoma
Leptosphaeria trevoae
Leptosphaeria trichopterygis
Leptosphaeria trifolii
Leptosphaeria trifolii-alpestris
Leptosphaeria trollii
Leptosphaeria tungurahuensis
Leptosphaeria tupae
Leptosphaeria ucrainica
Leptosphaeria uliginosa
Leptosphaeria ulmicola
Leptosphaeria usneae
Leptosphaeria vagabunda
Leptosphaeria valdiviensis
Leptosphaeria valdobbiae
Leptosphaeria valesiaca
Leptosphaeria variabilis
Leptosphaeria variegata
Leptosphaeria veratri
Leptosphaeria veronicae
Leptosphaeria verwoerdiana
Leptosphaeria viciae
Leptosphaeria vindobonensis
Leptosphaeria vitensis
Leptosphaeria vrieseae
Leptosphaeria waghorniana
Leptosphaeria wehmeyeri
Leptosphaeria weimeri
Leptosphaeria williamsii
Leptosphaeria woodrowi-wilsoni
Leptosphaeria woroninii
Leptosphaeria xylogena
Leptosphaeria yerbae
Leptosphaeria zahlbruckneri
Leptosphaeria zeae
Leptosphaeria zeae-maydis
Leptosphaeria zeicola
Leptosphaeria zingiberis
Leptosphaeria zizaniivora

References

External links
 

Pleosporales
Taxa named by Giuseppe De Notaris
Taxa named by Vincenzo de Cesati
Taxa described in 1863
Dothideomycetes genera